Varanus reisingeri, known commonly as Reisinger's tree monitor and the Yellow tree monitor, is a species of monitor lizard in the family Varanidae. The species is endemic to Indonesia. It was at one point at least considered an allopatric insular subspecies of the green tree monitor, due to physical and genetic similarities.

Etymology
The specific name, reisingeri, is in honor of Manfred Reisinger, a German naturalist and reptile breeder.

Geographic range
Varanus reisingeri is found on the island of Misool in West Papua, Indonesia.

Habitat

References

Further reading
Eidenmüller, Bernd; Wicker, Rudolf (20015) "Eine weitere neue Waranart aus dem Varanus prasinus-Komplex von der Insel Misol, Indonesien ". Sauria 27 (1): 3–8. (Varanus reisingeri, new species). (in German, with an abstract in English).
Ziegler T, Schmitz A, Koch A, Böhme W (2007). "A review of the subgenus Euprepiosaurus of Varanus (Squamata: Varanidae): morphological and molecular phylogeny, distribution and zoogeography, with an identification key for members of the V. indicus and the V. prasinus species groups". Zootaxa 1472: 1-28.

Varanus
Reptiles described in 2005
Reptiles of Indonesia